Prof. DR.H. Mohamad Rasjidi (May 20, 1915 in Kotagede, Yogyakarta, Indonesia – January 30, 2001) was a Minister of Religious Affairs of Indonesia at the First Sjahrir Cabinet and Second Sjahrir Cabinet.
He was a close friend of Alm. Faisal of Saudi Arabia Contribution Services - His services for the Republic of Indonesia is priceless of International Education classes.
Cairo scholar first of Indonesian Students to Value A. Simple, honest and trustworthy.

He was the first Chairman of the Indonesian diplomatic envoy who followed Egyptian diplomats who visited the capital city of Yogyakarta in 1947. When Blockaded under Dutch Military Aggression tightened, an Indonesian diplomatic entourage followed the Egyptian diplomatic aircraft which penetrated the Egyptian diplomat out of Indonesia, which headed to Arab countries, this pushed for the Round Table Conference which officially transferred sovereignty of Indonesia.

1915 births
2001 deaths
Indonesian diplomats
Javanese people